Basu Chatterjee (10 January 1927 – 4 June 2020) was an Indian film director and screenwriter.

Through the 1970s and 1980s, he became associated with what came to be known as middle cinema or middle-of-the-road cinema filmmakers, such as Hrishikesh Mukherjee and Basu Bhattacharya, whom he assisted on Teesri Kasam (1966). Like their films, his films dealt with light-hearted stories of middle-class families often in urban settings, focusing on marital and love relationships, with exceptions such as Ek Ruka Hua Faisla (1986) and Kamla Ki Maut (1989), which delved into social and moral issues. He is best known for his films Us Paar, Chhoti Si Baat (1975), Chitchor (1976), Rajnigandha (1974), Piya Ka Ghar (1972), Khatta Meetha, Swami (1977), Baton Baton Mein (1979), Priyatama (1977), Man Pasand, Hamari Bahu Alka, Shaukeen (1982), and Chameli Ki Shaadi (1986), which was his last commercially successful movie. 

Chatterjee directed the Bengali film Hothath Brishti (1998), which featured actors from both Bangladesh and India. The film featured Ferdous Ahmed from Bangladesh, and Priyanka Trivedi and Sreelekha Mitra from West Bengal. Chatterjee continued to cast Ahmed in subsequent Indian-Bengali films, including Chupi Chupi (2001), Tak Jhal Mishti (2002) and Hotath Shedin (2012), another joint production of Bangladesh and India. He wrote the script for the Bangladeshi film Ek Cup Cha, directed by Noyeem Imtiaz Neamul.

Early life 
Basu Chatterjee was born in Ajmer, Rajasthan, India, in a Bengali family. His middle class upbringing reflected in his movies that explored areas which were far removed from the glitz and glamour of the blockbusters of the time.

Career 
In 1950s, Chatterjee arrived in Bombay (now Mumbai) and started his career as an illustrator and cartoonist for the weekly tabloid Blitz published by Russi Karanjia. He worked there for 18 years before changing career paths to filmmaking, when he assisted Basu Bhattacharya in the Raj Kapoor and Waheeda Rehman starrer Teesri Kasam (1966), which later won the National Film Award for Best Feature Film. Eventually, he made his directorial debut with Sara Akash in 1969, which won him the Filmfare Best Screenplay Award.

Some of his most critically acclaimed films are Sara Akash (1969), Piya Ka Ghar (1971), Us Paar (1974), Rajnigandha (1974), Chhoti Si Baat (1975), Chitchor (1976), Swami (1977), Khatta Meetha, Priyatama, Chakravyuha (1978 film), Jeena Yahan (1979), Baton Baton Mein (1979), Apne Paraye (1980), Shaukeen and Ek Ruka Hua Faisla.

Other films include Ratnadeep, Safed Jhooth, Man Pasand, Hamari Bahu Alka, Kamla Ki Maut and Triyacharitra. 

He has also directed many Bengali films such as Hothat Brishti, Hochcheta Ki and Hothat Shei Din. 

Chatterjee directed the television series Byomkesh Bakshi and Rajani for Doordarshan. He was a member of the jury at the 10th Moscow International Film Festival in 1977 and a member of the International Film And Television Club of the Asian Academy of Film & Television. A retrospective of Chatterjee's work was held as part of the Kala Ghoda Art Festival Mumbai in February of 2011.

Awards 
 2007: IIFA Lifetime Achievement Award
 1992: National Film Award for Best Film on Family Welfare - Durga
 1991: Filmfare Best Screenplay Award – Kamla Ki Maut
 1980: Filmfare Critics Award for Best Movie – Jeena Yahan
 1978: National Film Award for Best Popular Film Providing Wholesome Entertainment - Swami
 1978: Filmfare Best Director Award – Swami
 1977: Filmfare Best Screenplay Award - Chitchor Nominee
 1976: Filmfare Best Screenplay Award – Chhoti Si Baat
 1975: Filmfare Critics Award for Best Movie – Rajnigandha
 1972: Filmfare Best Screenplay Award – Sara Akash

Filmography

Dialogue writer

Screenplay

Producer

Director (TV series)

Assistant director

Death 
Chatterjee died due to an age-related illness at his house in Mumbai on 4 June 2020. He was 93 years old.

References

External links 
 
 Official website

1930 births
2020 deaths
Film directors from Rajasthan
Bengali film directors
Hindi-language film directors
People from Ajmer
Filmfare Awards winners
University of Calcutta alumni
Indian television directors
Indian male screenwriters
20th-century Indian film directors
21st-century Indian film directors
Directors who won the Best Popular Film Providing Wholesome Entertainment National Film Award
Directors who won the Best Film on Family Welfare National Film Award